The 7th Central People's Committee (CPC) of North Korea was elected by the 1st Session of the 7th Supreme People's Assembly on 5 April 1982. It was replaced on 30 December 1986 by the 8th CPC.

Members

References

Citations

Bibliography
Books:
 

7th Supreme People's Assembly
Central People's Committee
1982 establishments in North Korea
1986 disestablishments in North Korea